Pavel Markov (1897–1980) was a Soviet theatre critic, literary manager, and teacher. Between 1925 and 1949, he was head of the Literary Section of the Moscow Art Theatre. He was the chairman of the "lower committee" of the theatre's management. He has been described as "the most outstanding teacher and critic of his generation."

References

Sources

 Benedetti, Jean. 1999. Stanislavski: His Life and Art. Revised edition. Original edition published in 1988. London: Methuen. .
 Worrall, Nick. 1996. The Moscow Art Theatre. Theatre Production Studies ser. London and NY: Routledge. .

1897 births
1980 deaths
Moscow Art Theatre
Soviet educators
Soviet theatre critics